The 1925 Southern Conference men's basketball tournament took place from February 26–March 3, 1925, at Municipal Auditorium in Atlanta, Georgia. The North Carolina Tar Heels won their third Southern Conference title, led by head coach Monk McDonald.

Bracket

* Overtime game

Championship

All-Southern tournament team

See also
List of Southern Conference men's basketball champions

References

Tournament
Southern Conference men's basketball tournament
Southern Conference men's basketball tournament
Southern Conference men's basketball tournament
Southern Conference men's basketball tournament